Betty Fabila (born 28 May 1929) is a Mexican retired soprano opera singer and biologist.

Born in Mexico City, she studied at Mexico's National Conservatory of Music and the National School of Music at the National Autonomous University of Mexico under the baritone David Silva. In 1950, she made her operatic debut as Musetta in La bohème at the Palacio de Bellas Artes in Mexico City and went on to sing leading roles there in operas including  La traviata, Madama Butterfly, L'amico Fritz, Faust, Carmen, La serva padrona, Il segreto di Susanna, Werther, and Don Giovanni

With her husband, the Italian conductor and musicologist Uberto Zanolli, she also developed programs for Mexican television. She later became a biologist and ethnologist and taught at the Escuela Nacional Preparatoria where she was a founding member of the school's chamber orchestra and its soprano soloist from  1972 to 1994.

In 1962,  at the Castle of Chapultepec in Mexico City, Fabila  gave the first modern performances of solo cantatas by the Italian baroque composer Giacomo Facco, whose scores had been discovered by her husband in the National Library of Paris.

Zanolli and Fabila's daughter, Betty Zanolli Fabila, is a classical pianist and music teacher.

Sources
Díaz Du-Pond, Carlos, La ópera en México de 1924 a 1984: testimonio operístico, Universidad Nacional Autónoma de México, 1986

External links
 Betty Fabila's blog
Official website of Uberto Zanolli

Mexican operatic sopranos
Singers from Mexico City
1929 births
Living people
20th-century Mexican women opera singers